Theodor Ferdinand Leupold was a German racing cyclist from Zittau.  He competed at the 1896 Summer Olympics in Athens.

Leupold competed in the 333 metres and 100 kilometres races.  He tied with two other cyclists for fifth place in the 333 metres at 27.0 seconds and was among the seven cyclists that did not finish the longer one (out of nine that started).

References

External links

Olympic cyclists of Germany
Cyclists at the 1896 Summer Olympics
19th-century sportsmen
German male cyclists
Year of birth missing
Year of death missing
People from Zittau
Cyclists from Saxony
Place of death missing